Alfie Hewett defeated the two-time defending champion Shingo Kunieda in the final, 7–6(7–2), 6–1 to win the men's singles wheelchair tennis title at the 2022 US Open. It was his third US Open singles title and sixth major singles title overall. Kunieda was attempting to complete the first Grand Slam in wheelchair men's singles history.

Seeds

Draw

Finals

References

External links 
 Draw

Wheelchair Men's Singles
U.S. Open, 2022 Men's Singles